Luis Colman (22 June 1954 – 13 September 2014) was a Uruguayan rower. He competed in the men's coxed pair event at the 1968 Summer Olympics.

References

External links
 

1954 births
2014 deaths
Uruguayan male rowers
Olympic rowers of Uruguay
Rowers at the 1968 Summer Olympics
Sportspeople from Montevideo